Tom Eagles is a New Zealand film editor.

Eagles was nominated for an Academy Award for Best Film Editing and BAFTA Award for Best Editing for his editing of Taika Waititi's film, Jojo Rabbit (2019).

Filmography

References

External links 

 Tom Eagles on IMDb
Tom Eagles on New Zealand Film Commission

New Zealand film editors
Living people
Year of birth missing (living people)